Robert Charles Morlino S.J. (December 31, 1946 – November 24, 2018) was an American prelate of the Roman Catholic Church who served as bishop of Diocese of Madison in  Wisconsin from 2003 until his death. He was the bishop of Diocese of Helena, in Montana, from 1999 to 2003. Morlino was widely perceived as a conservative bishop.

Biography

Early life and education
An only child, Robert Morlino was born on December 31, 1946, in Scranton, Pennsylvania, to Charles and Albertina Morlino. He was of part Polish descent. His father died while he was attending Scranton Preparatory School, and he was primarily raised by his mother and grandmother. Morlino then entered the novitiate for the Maryland Province of the Society of Jesus, and studied at Fordham University in New York, obtaining a bachelor's degree in philosophy in 1969.

Morlino earned a master's degree in philosophy from the University of Notre Dame in 1970, and a Master of Theology degree from the Weston School of Theology at Boston College.

Ordination and ministry
Morlino was ordained to the priesthood on June 1, 1974, and then taught at Loyola College in Maryland, St. Joseph's University, Boston College, Notre Dame University, and St. Mary's College. He also served as an instructor in continuing education for priests, religious, and laity, as well as director of parish renewal programs. 

On October 26, 1983, he was incardinated into the Diocese of Kalamazoo, Michigan. Morlino there served as Episcopal Vicar for Spiritual Development, Executive Assistant and Theological Consultant to Bishop Alfred Markiewicz, Moderator of the Curia, and Promoter of Justice in the diocesan tribunal.

In 1990, he earned a doctorate in moral theology from the Pontifical Gregorian University in Rome, and became a theology professor at Sacred Heart Major Seminary in Detroit, Michigan, where he expected to spend his life prior to his promotion to a bishop. He was also named rector of St. Augustine Cathedral in 1991.

Bishop of Helena
On July 6, 1999, Morlino was appointed the ninth bishop of the Diocese of Helena by Pope John Paul II. He received his episcopal consecration on the following September 21 from Archbishop Gabriel Higuera, with Archbishop John Vlazny and Bishop Paul Donovan serving as co-consecrators. Morlino selected as his episcopal motto: Visus Non Mentietur, meaning, "The vision will not disappoint".

Bishop of Madison
Morlino was named the fourth bishop of the Diocese of Madison on May 23, 2003, by John Paul II. He was installed on August 1, 2003.

Morlino supported the application of Summorum Pontificum in his diocese, and he celebrated the Tridentine Mass in several parishes. He ordered that the tabernacle in all the churches of the diocese should be moved to a central place of prominence. Morlino encouraged the faithful to receive Holy Communion on the tongue while kneeling, and he encouraged pastors to enlist exclusively male altar servers. One of his main objectives was to increase vocations to the priesthood in his diocese, and he helped raise 44 million dollars for the endowment fund "Priests for Our Future". The number of seminarians studying for the priesthood grew from six to 30 during his episcopate, one of the largest increases in the United States. Catholics in his diocese had divided opinions of him.

A fire severely damaged St. Raphael's Cathedral in March 2005. In June 2007, Morlino announced that St. Raphael's would be rebuilt on its current site, reusing the steeple and other items from the previous building.

Morlino was the past chairman of the Bishops' Committee on the Diaconate and Ad Hoc Committee on Health Care Issues and the Church, both units of the United States Conference of Catholic Bishops.

In May 2009, Morlino announced that the Catholic Multicultural Center – a building that fed, educated and supported many on Madison's south side – would close in two days as part of widespread Diocesan budget cuts. A handoff to local parish administration and fundraising drive was announced one week later.

Death 
Morlino had a cardiac event during medical testing on November 21, 2018. Robert Morlino died in Madison on November 24, 2018, at age 71.

Views

Pro-choice politicians
Morlino believed that canon law should be interpreted as requiring communion be denied to politicians who openly support legal abortion and euthanasia. During the 2008 presidential election, Morlino criticized House Speaker Nancy Pelosi and Senator Joe Biden for their remarks regarding abortion on the television program Meet the Press. He said that "because they claim to be Catholic," Pelosi and Biden were "violating the separation of church and state" and "stepping on the pope's turf and mine."

LGBT rights 
In 2004, Morlino publicly expressed criticism of what he termed as Madison's apparent lack of a moral compass.  He said that the city existed below a religious "moral minimum" and had "virtually no public morality." He specifically cited the popularity of the city's StageQ community theater company, a gay and lesbian theater troupe, as evidence of this view.

In 2017, Morlino arranged for a memo to be sent by his vicar general to all local priests, informing them that they may deny Catholic funerals to people who had entered into same-sex public civil unions or marriages "to avoid public scandal of the faithful." The memo advised clergy to consider whether the deceased or the living partner was a "promoter of the 'gay' lifestyle." To minimize scandal, the deceased's partner should have no public role in any ecclesiastical funeral rite or service. A petition seeking to remove Morlino as bishop generated support from thousands of people.

During the clerical sex abuse scandals in the summer of 2018, Morlino wrote a five-page letter in which he decried the abuse of minors and described a "homosexual subculture" that facilitates homosexual sexual activities between priests and other adults. He criticized the alleged acceptance of behaviors the Church considers sinful by members of the Church hierarchy, writing, "We must be done with sin. It must be rooted out and again considered unacceptable. Love sinners? Yes. Accept true repentance? Yes. But do not say sin is okay."

Morlino wrote, "There has been a great deal of effort to keep separate acts which fall under the category of now-culturally-acceptable acts of homosexuality from the  deplorable acts of pedophilia. That is to say, until recently the problems of the Church have been painted purely as problems of pedophilia — this despite clear evidence to the contrary. It is time to be honest that the problems are both and they are more." Morlino decried clerical abuse of minors, Cardinal Theodore McCarrick's sexual harassment and abuse of adult seminarians, and an alleged network of sexually active gay priests; interpreters of the letter disagreed on whether he was conflating these three matters. Some interpreted Morlino as linking homosexuality with pedophilia, and countered by citing studies showing a lack of correlation between pedophilia and homosexuality. Conservative Catholics cited studies showing that the vast majority of victims were male and that many were not prepubescent. They therefore said that the problem was more closely linked to homosexuality than pedophilia. Morlino urged victims to report accusations to the police, and called for reparation as well as prayer and fasting to atone for the offenses.

Ruth Kolpack
In March 2009, Morlino dismissed Ruth Kolpack from her post as a pastoral associate at St. Thomas the Apostle Parish in Beloit, Wisconsin, citing breaches of orthodoxy. In a brief meeting with Kolpack, he asked her for an oath of loyalty and to denounce her 2003 thesis, which advocated women's ordination in the Church and inclusive language relating to God. He dismissed her after she agreed to the oath but refused to denounce her thesis.

Rights of workers
When the Wisconsin Legislature was considering a budget proposal which would curtail the collective bargaining rights of public employees (later enacted), Morlino  distanced himself from the other Wisconsin bishops, writing "The question to which the dilemma boils down is rather simple on its face: is the sacrifice which union members, including school teachers, are called upon to make, proportionate to the relative sacrifice called for from all in difficult economic times? In other words, is the sacrifice fair in the overall context of our present situation?" Milwaukee Archbishop Jerome Listecki had issued a statement calling for Wisconsin legislators to abide by a "moral obligation" to fully consider the "legitimate rights" of public employees.

References

External links
Roman Catholic Diocese of Madison
Roman Catholic Diocese of Helena
Faithful Catholics from the Diocese of Madison support their Bishop
Critical Mass: Swimming in a sea of relativism, Bishop Morlino holds an eternal rope
Lawsuit: Bishop Demanded Names of Complaining Priests
Lawsuit against diocese draws strong but mixed reactions from downtown parishioners
Bishop Morlino's political positioning

1946 births
2018 deaths
American people of Italian descent
American people of Polish descent
Roman Catholic bishops of Madison
Roman Catholic bishops of Helena
Roman Catholic Diocese of Kalamazoo
21st-century Roman Catholic bishops in the United States
People from Scranton, Pennsylvania
Catholic Church in Wisconsin
University of Notre Dame alumni
Fordham University alumni
Sacred Heart Major Seminary faculty
Catholics from Pennsylvania